KGHO (99.9 FM, "Classic Rock and Roll") is an American radio station broadcasting an oldies music format. Licensed to serve the Tacoma and Grays Harbor areas. The city of license community is Hoquiam, Washington, the station is currently owned by Grays Harbor LP FM.

References

External links

GHO-LP
GHO-LP
Grays Harbor County, Washington